"Best Friend" is a single released by Japanese pop and R&B singer-songwriter Kana Nishino. It was released on February 24, 2010, by her record label SME Records. This single is also used as the new CM song for mobile phone operator NTT docomo.

The song has been certified as being downloaded as a ringtone one million times, and as a full-length download to cellphones 750,000 times.

Track listing

Sample credits
"One Way Love" samples Lil' Kim's and Snoop Dogg's "Kronik"

Oricon Charts (Japan)

References

See also
 Make Your Best Friend Fall In Love With You at Bright Success

Kana Nishino songs
2010 singles
RIAJ Digital Track Chart number-one singles
Japanese-language songs
2010 songs
SME Records singles